Psychroflexus sediminis  is a Gram-negative, mesophilic, slightly halophilic and non-motile bacteria from the genus of Psychroflexus which has been isolated from a salt lake in Qaidam Basin in China.

References

Further reading

External links
 Psychroflexus sediminis at MicrobeWiki
Type strain of Psychroflexus sediminis at BacDive -  the Bacterial Diversity Metadatabase

Flavobacteria
Bacteria described in 2009